Gaṅgaikoṇḍa Chōḻapuram is a village located near to Jayankondam, Ariyalur district, Tamil Nadu, India. It became the capital of the Chola dynasty in c. 1025 by Chola emperor Rajendra I, and served as the capital for around 250 years.

As of 2014, the ancient city exists as a heritage town in the Ariyalur district of Tamil Nadu, India. The great Arulmigu Peruvudaiyar Temple at this place is next only to the Arulmigu Peruvudaiyar Kovil at Thanjavur in its monumental nature and surpasses it in sculptural quality. It has been recognised as a World Heritage site by UNESCO.

History 

The city was founded by Rajendra I to commemorate his victory over the Pala Dynasty. The translation of the city's name may be split into Gangai (Ganga)/ Konda (Obtained)/ Chola (Chola)/ Puram (City). Hence, it refers to the city of the Cholas built on a locale to commemorate the occasion when the water of the Ganga was obtained. It is now a small village, its past eminence only remembered by the existence of the Mahashiva Temple. The Chola Empire included the whole of southern India to the river Tungabhadra in the north. For administrative and strategic purposes, they built a new capital and named it Gangaikonda Cholapuram.

The city seems to have had two fortifications, one inner and the other outer. The outer was probably wider. The remains of the outer fortification can be seen as a mound running all around the palace.

Excavations suggest that the outer fortification was built of burnt bricks, was about six to eight feet wide. It consisted of two walls, the intervening space (the core) being filled with sand. The bricks are fairly large in size and are made of well-burnt clay. The Tamil Nadu State Archaeological Department has taken up fresh excavations to probe a nearby village named Ayudhkalam which is believed to have weapon manufacturing workshops, as the name suggests.

The surviving temple in Gangaikonda Cholapuram was completed in 1035 CE. Rajendra emulated the temple built by his father after his victory in a campaign across India that Chola era texts state covered Karnataka, Andhra Pradesh, Odisha, and Bengal. After his victory, he demanded that the defeated kingdoms send pots of Ganges River water and pour it into the well of this temple.

Rajendra I, according to Tamil tradition, thereafter assumed the name of Gangaikonda Cholan, meaning the one who conquered the Ganges. He established Gangaikonda Cholapuram as his capital from the medieval Chola capital of Thanjavur, which would go on to become the capital for the next 250 years. Rajendra I built the entire capital with several temples using plans and infrastructure recommended in Tamil Vastu and Agama sastra texts. These included a Dharma Sasta, Vishnu and other temples. However, all of these were destroyed in the late 13th and 14th centuries except the Brihadishvara temple. The other Chola landmarks are evidenced by soil covered mounds and excavated broken pillar stumps and brick walls found over an area of several kilometres from the surviving temple.

The reasons for the city's destruction are unclear. According to Vansanthi, the Pandyas who defeated the Cholas during the later part of the 13th century "may have razed the city to the ground" to avenge their previous defeats. However, it is unclear why other temples were destroyed and this temple was spared, as well as why there are around 20 inscriptions from later Cholas, Pandyas and Vijayanagar Empire indicating various gifts and grants to this temple. An alternate theory links the destruction to the raids and wars, particularly with the invasion of the capital city and the territories that were earlier a part by the Chola Empire along with Madurai by the armies of Delhi Sultanate led by the Muslim commander Malik Kafur in 1311, followed by Khusrau Khan in 1314 and Muhammad bin Tughlaq in 1327. The period that followed saw wars between the Hindu kings and the Muslim Sultans who seceded the Delhi Sultanate and carved out new polity such as the nearby Madurai Sultanate (1335–1378). The Vijayanagara Empire defeated the Madurai Sultanate in 1378 and this temple along with other Chola era temples thereafter came under Hindu kings again who repaired and restored many of them. The temple has been re-consecrated in 2017 with installation of a dwajasthambam and performing maha kumbhabhishekam

Arts and architecture 
Chola rulers were patrons of the arts and architecture. They built the temple of Gangaikondacholisvara. The temple has sculptures of exceptional quality. The bronzes of Bhogasakti and Subrahmanya are masterpieces of Chola metal icons. The Saurapitha (Solar altar), the lotus altar with eight deities, is considered auspicious. The shiva lingam is made from single rock.

The Chola rulers constructed enormous stone temple complexes with intricate carvings of Hindu gods. Rajaraja I built the famous Brihdrishvara temple at Thanjavur, which is about 50 km away from city of Gangaikonda Cholapuram, between 1003 and 1010 CE. Shiva is worshipped here. The grandeur of this temple has not been diminished by age. There is a massive statue of Nandi, the sacred bull of Shiva, in the central courtyard of the temple.

The exquisite bronze statues of the Chola period are known the world over for their grace and lifelike appearance. Many beautiful figures of Nataraja, or the dancing Shiva, were made during the Chola era.

Royal Palace 

The royal palace also was built of burnt brick. The ceilings were covered with flat tiles of small size, laid in a number of courses, in fine lime mortar. The pillars were probably made of polished wood, supported on granite bases; a few pillar bases have survived to this day. Iron nails and clamps have been recovered from this palace site. There is a tunnel that links the palace and the temple inner 1st prakaara (north).

In the reign of Virarajendra Chola, Rajendra's third son, the palace at Gangaikondacholapuram is referred to as Chola-Keralan Thirumaligai (Chola Keralan palace) evidently after one of the titles of Rajendra I. The same inscription mentions a few parts of the palace as adibhumi (the ground floor), Kilaisopana (the eastern portico), and a seat named Mavali vanadhirajan. Evidently the palace was multistoried. In an inscription dated in the 49th year of Kulothunga I (1119 CE) reference is made to Gangaikondacholamaligai at this place. It is likely that there were more than one royals building each having their own name.

Roads and City gates 

Besides the names of the palace and fort walls, the names of a few roads and streets are preserved in the epigraphs. The entryways named Thiruvasal, the eastern gate and the Vembugudi gate, evidently the south gate leading to the village Vembugudi situated in that direction are mentioned. Reference is also found to highways named after Rajaraja and Rajendra as Rajarajan Peruvali and Rajendran Peruvali. Other streets mentioned in epigraphs are the ten streets (Pattu teru), the gateway lane (Thiruvasal Narasam) and the Suddhamali lane. The inscription also refers to the highways, Kulottungacholan Thirumadil peruvali, Vilangudaiyan Peruvali and Kulaiyanai pona Peruvali (the highway through which a short elephant passed by).

City layout 

The epigraphs also refer to the Madhurantaka Vadavaru, now called the Vadavaru, running about six kilometers east of the ruined capital. Madhurantaka Vedavaru, named after one of the titles of Rajendra I, was a source of irrigation to a vast stretch of land bordering the capital. An irrigation channel called Anaivettuvan is also mentioned.

"Anaivettuvan" - Anai means irrigation (step irrigation) vettuvan means labour or engineer.

There were both wet and dry lands inside the Fort, used for cultivation and other purposes. The present positions of the existing temples throw some light on the lay out of the city. With the palace as the centre to the city, the great temple, and the other temples in the city seem to have been erected. Towards the northeast (Isanya) of the palace is the great temple of Siva. The Siva temple according to Vastu and traditional texts should be in the northeast of the city or village and should face east. The temple of Vishnu should be in the west.

A number of small tanks and ponds mentioned in inscriptions and a number of wells, supplied drinking water to the residents.

Notes

References

Bibliography
 
 
 Nagasamy R, Rajapalayam (1970), State Department of Archaeology, Government of Tamil Nadu
 Nilakanta Sastri, K. A., The Cholas (1955), University of Madras, Reprinted 1984

External links 

Maligai Medu – Buried in Time

Chola dynasty
Former capital cities in India
Former populated places in India
Archaeological sites in Tamil Nadu
Archaeological monuments in Tamil Nadu
Cities and towns in Ariyalur district